Avigdor (also Abigdor, Awigdor, from I Chronicles 4.18,  = Avi Gedor) is a Hebrew masculine given-name.

Given names
Avigdor Aptowitzer
Avigdor Arikha (1929–2010), Israeli-French painter, printmaker, and art historian
Avigdor Ben-Gal (1936-2016), Israeli general
Abigdor Cohen of Vienna (c. 13th century), Austrian Talmudist
Avigdor Dagan (1912–2006), also known as Viktor Fischl, Israeli writer, playwright and diplomat
Avigdor Eskin, Russian-Israeli political activist
Avigdor Glogauer (–1810), German grammarian and poet
Avigdor Kahalani, Israeli soldier and politician
Avigdor Lieberman, Israeli politician, leader of the Yisrael Beiteinu party
Avigdor Miller (1908–2001), American rabbi, author and lecturer
Avigdor Moskowitz (born 1953), Israeli basketball player
Avigdor Nebenzahl, former chief rabbi of the Old City of Jerusalem
Avigdor Stematsky (1908–1989), Israeli painter
Avigdor Yitzhaki, Israeli politician, former member of the Knesset for Kadima
Ephraim Avigdor Speiser

Surnames
Avigdor (French family) (or d'Avigdor), a French Jewish pedigree; (de)
Abraham Abigdor (b. 1350), French-Jewish physician, philosopher, and translator
Maestro Abraham Abigdor
Henri Salomon d'Avigdor
Henry d'Avigdor-Goldsmid
Isaak Samuel d'Avigdor (Isaac Samuel d'Avigdor)
James d'Avigdor-Goldsmid
Rabbi Dr. Jacob Avigdor (1896–1967), also known as Yaakov Avigdor, author and rabbi in Poland and Mexico
Rabbi Isaac C. Avigdor (1920–2010), son of  Rabbi Dr. Jacob Avigdor
Solomon Avigdor (b. 1384), French-Jewish translator of Hebrew

External links

Hebrew-language names
Hebrew-language given names
Jewish masculine given names